Pétanque at the 2005 Southeast Asian Games took place in the Hidden Vale Sports Club in Angeles City, Philippines.

The event was held from December 1–4.

Pétanque is a form of boules where the goal is to throw metal balls as close as possible to a jack (a small wooden ball called a cochonnet in French, which means piglet). The game is normally played on hard sand or gravel, but can also be played on grass or any other surface. Similar games are bocce and bowls.

Medal winners

Petanque Medals Ranking by country at 2005 SEA Games

References

External links
Southeast Asian Games Official Results

2005 Southeast Asian Games events
2005 in bowls
2005